The Nigerian National Assembly delegation from Benue comprises three Senators representing Benue South, Benue North-East, and Benue North-West, and ten Representatives representing Apa/Agatu, Kwande/Ushongo, Oju/Obi Vandeikya/Konshisha, Buruku, Ado/Ogbadigba/Opkokwu, Katsina-Ala/Ukum/Logo, Gboko/Tarka, and Makurdi/Guma,Gwer/Gwer-west.

Fourth Republic

The 9th Parliament (2019 till date)

The 8th Parliament (2015 - 2019)

The 7th Parliament (2011 - 2015)

The 4th Parliament (1999 - 2003)

References
Official Website - National Assembly House of Representatives (Benue State)
 Senator List

Politics of Benue State
National Assembly (Nigeria) delegations by state